Grow Your Own Drugs is a British television documentary series, first broadcast on BBC Two, exploring the many remedies which can be provided by plants. James Wong, an ethnobotanist, presents the series and takes the view that people should start making their own remedies in order to save money and feel healthier plus providing simple remedies to everyday ailments. Wong tries out his remedies on members of the public in order to demonstrate the beneficial effects of natural remedies, adding appropriate safety warnings. He is careful to stress that viewers should always seek medical advice before trying natural medicines, and in discussing the outcomes of treatment always states "It's not a clinical trial..." and acknowledges that results might be attributed to a placebo effect.

Proving a huge ratings success for the BBC, the programme quickly became the highest rated gardening programme in the UK, producing an internationally best-selling book, by the same title, as a spin-off. In 2009, the series also won "Best Television Programme" at the UK Garden Media Guild Awards.

Wong's says:

and:

A special edition, Grow Your Own Drugs for Christmas, focusing mostly on the applications of plants associated with the season such as holly, ivy, mistletoe and pine, aired on 16 December 2009.

A second series began airing on 23 March 2010.

Episodes

Season 1

Special

Season 2

References

External links 
 
 BBC Press Office Programme Information
 James Wong : Official Site More information on "Grow Your Own Drugs", including recipes, video clips and more.

BBC television documentaries
2010s British television series
2009 British television series debuts
2010 British television series endings
Television series by Sony Pictures Television